Cameraria borneensis is a moth of the family Gracillariidae. It is known from Sabah, Malaysia.

The wingspan is about 4.2 mm.

The larvae feed on Archidendron species. They mine the leaves of their host plant. Blotch mines of this species occur on the lower side of the leaf and are slightly tentiformed at mature stage.

References

Cameraria (moth)

Leaf miners
Moths described in 1993
Lepidoptera of Malaysia
Moths of Asia
Taxa named by Tosio Kumata